was a prominent Japanese pathologist, famous for discovering the Yoshida sarcoma. In addition, he is known for demonstrating the chemical-induced hepatocarcinogenesis in rats with his mentor Takaoki Sasaki.

Yoshida received the Imperial Prize of the Japan Academy twice (1936 and 1953) as well as the Robert Koch Gold Medal (1963).

Contribution
In the 1930s Yoshida and Sasaki showed the induction of liver cancer in rats by Ortho-Aminoazotoluene. Since that time, a large amount of data has confirmed the carcinogenic activity of Azo dyes.

In 1943, Yoshida found a cancer cell line, so-called Yoshida Sarcoma, and experimentally proved that cancer is generated from cancer cells. His findings opened the way of cancer research in terms of cells, and developed biomedical research on chemotherapy.

Biography
Yoshida was born in Asakawa, Fukushima and graduated from the Medical School, Imperial University of Tokyo in 1927. He was an assistant professor of pathology at the same institution from 1927 to 1929. In 1929 he moved to the Sasaki Institute to work on chemical-induced carcinogenesis with Takaoki Sasaki, before he went to Germany to study pathology in 1935.

After returning to his homeland, Yoshida served as a professor of pathology at Nagasaki University from 1938 to 1944, Tohoku University from 1944 to 1952, before being appointed as a professor of pathology at the Faculty of Medicine, University of Tokyo in 1952, where he became a dean in 1958. In addition, he became a director at the Sasaki Institute in 1953 and at the Cancer Institute, Japanese Foundation for Cancer Research in 1963.

Yoshida died in 1973 at the age of 70.

Recognition
 1936 Imperial Prize of the Japan Academy
 1952 Asahi Prize
 1953 Imperial Prize of the Japan Academy
 1956 Scheele Medal
 1959 Order of Culture
 1963 Robert Koch Gold Medal
 1965 Elected Member of the Japan Academy.
 1965 Elected Honorary Citizen of Asakawa
 1968 Honorary Doctorate, University of Milan

Tomizo Yoshida Award

Since 1992 the Japanese Cancer Association, the town office of Asakawa, and Tomizo Yoshida Memorial Hall have annually awarded the Tomizo Yoshida Award to researchers who made outstanding achievement in the field of cancer research. At the annual award presentation held in Asakawa, Fukushima, winners receive one million yen and a diploma.

Past award winners include the following:
1992 Takashi Sugimura, National Cancer Center (Japan)
1999 Mitsuaki Yoshida, BANYU Pharmaceutical Co.
2002 Yusuke Nakamura, University of Tokyo
2008 Tadatsugu Taniguchi, University of Tokyo
2012 Shigekazu Nagata, Kyoto University

Yamagiwa-Yoshida Memorial international study grants
After his death, Japanese cancer researchers established the Yamagiwa-Yoshida Memorial international study grants in honor of Katsusaburō Yamagiwa and Tomizo Yoshida. Since its inception in 1975, the grants supported by the Japan National Committee, Union for International Cancer Control, have contributed to the development of the professional capacity of over 330 Fellows from over 40 countries.

External links
吉田富三記念館 Tomizo Yoshida Memorial Hall

References

Cancer researchers
Japanese pathologists
1903 births
1973 deaths
People from Fukushima Prefecture
Laureates of the Imperial Prize
Recipients of the Order of Culture
Academic staff of the University of Tokyo
Academic staff of Tohoku University
University of Tokyo alumni
20th-century Japanese physicians
Foreign Fellows of the Indian National Science Academy